Notable people bearing the name Parashar include:

 
 
 Amol Parashar - Indian actor 
 Deepak Parashar - Indian actor and former model
 Narain Chand Parashar - Indian parliamentarian, professor, linguist and writer.
 Pankuj Parashar - Indian film and television director
 Prastuti Parashar - Indian actress from Assam
 Rick Parashar - American record producer, recording engineer and musician
 Sat Parashar - Indian financial management expert and business education administrator
 Sushil Parashar - Indian actor
 Vijay P. Parashar - Oral and maxillofacial radiologist

See also
Indian surnames